Guido Guerrieri (born 25 February 1996) is an Italian professional footballer who plays as a goalkeeper for Bulgarian club Tsarsko Selo Sofia.

Club career
Guerrieri made his professional debut in the Serie B for Trapani on 28 August 2016 in a game against Novara.
On 30 November 2017, he signed a contract with Lazio until 2021.

He made his only first-team appearance for Lazio on 20 May 2019 in a 3–3 Serie A draw with Bologna, remaining a backup for the rest of his years with the club.

On 1 September 2020 he joined Salernitana on a 2-year contract. On 18 February 2022, Guerreri's contract with Salernitana was terminated by mutual consent.

Honours
Lazio
Coppa Italia: 2018–19
Supercoppa Italiana: 2017, 2019

References

External links
 

1996 births
Footballers from Rome
Living people
Italian footballers
Association football goalkeepers
Trapani Calcio players
S.S. Lazio players
U.S. Salernitana 1919 players
Serie A players
Serie B players